Tecticornia halocnemoides, commonly known as shrubby samphire or grey glasswort,  is a species of succulent, salt tolerant plant endemic to Australia. It grows as a spreading or erect shrub up to fifty centimetres high. It was first published as Arthrocnemum halocnemoides in 1845, but transferred into Halosarcia in 1980, and into Tecticornia in 2007.

It is a highly variable species, with five published subspecies, some of which are themselves highly variable. These are T. halocnemoides subsp. halocnemoides, T. halocnemoides subsp. caudata, T. halocnemoides subsp. longispicata, T. halocnemoides subsp. catenulata and T. halocnemoides subsp. tenuis. There is also an unpublished putative subspecies, which is currently given the manuscript name T. halocnemoides subsp. Lake Grace (N. Casson G231. 10).

References

 
 
 

halocnemoides
Caryophyllales of Australia
Flora of New South Wales
Flora of the Northern Territory
Flora of Queensland
Flora of South Australia
Flora of Victoria (Australia)
Eudicots of Western Australia
Halophytes
Taxa named by Christian Gottfried Daniel Nees von Esenbeck